Mont-Orford National Park is a national park in Orford, Quebec, Canada that is maintained and protected by the Sépaq. a provincial body.

Geography
The park is located immediately north of Magog in the Eastern Townships tourist region of the province. It encompasses several mountain peaks, among which are Mont Orford, Mont Giroux (Pic aux Corbeaux), Mont Alfred Desrochers, Mont Chauve, and the Massif des Chênes.

Recreation
The park is open year-round. Popular summer activities in the park include camping, hiking, swimming, cycling, canoeing, kayaking, pedalos, row boating, rock climbing, paddle surfing, and wildlife watching. The most popular winter sport in the park is alpine skiing, with cross-country skiing, snowshoeing, snow walking, and Ski-Vel (wheelchair skiing).

References

External links
 Official website of the park

National parks of Quebec
Protected areas of Estrie
Tourist attractions in Estrie
Canada geography articles needing translation from French Wikipedia